School for Coquettes  (French: L'école des cocottes) is a 1958 French comedy film directed by Jacqueline Audry and starring Dany Robin, Fernand Gravey and Bernard Blier. It was based on the 1918 play School for Coquettes by Marcel Gerbidon and Paul Armont.

Plot
A young Parisian woman attends a school for coquettes in order to  rise in society.

Main cast
 Dany Robin as Ginette Masson
 Fernand Gravey as Stanislas de La Ferronière
 Bernard Blier as Labaume
 Odette Laure as Amélie
 Darry Cowl as Gégène
 Suzanne Dehelly as Madame Bernoux
 Robert Vattier as Racinet
 Jean-Claude Brialy as Robert

References

External links

Gallery 

1958 films
French historical comedy films
1950s French-language films
Films directed by Jacqueline Audry
French films based on plays
Films set in Paris
1950s historical comedy films
Pathé films
Films set in the 1900s
1958 comedy films
1950s French films